Nenjirukkum Varai is a 1967 Indian Tamil-language film, directed and produced by C. V. Sridhar. The film stars Sivaji Ganesan, Muthuraman, Gopalakrishnan, K. R. Vijaya and Geetanjali. It revolves around a man struggling with poverty, falling in love with his house owner's daughter.

Sridhar initially decided to make Nenjirukkum Varai as revolving around the theme of war between India and Pakistan; the story was dropped after Sridhar learnt that Lal Bahadur Shastri and Ayub Khan signed the Tashkent Declaration. Retaining the same title, he developed a new story inspired by the Bengali play Shudha. The film was shot in black-and-white to emphasise the central theme of poverty, and none of the cast members applied make-up for their roles.

Nenjirukkum Varai was released on 2 March 1967 and failed at the box office.

Plot 

Raghu does odd jobs looking for a big break. He and his friend Peter rent a part of a house. The owner Natarajan's daughter is Raji. Raghu falls in love with her. Raghu meets Siva and likes his character. He lets him stay in his rented house. Raji and Siva fall in love. Raghu is devastated when he learns about it, but gets over it and decides to help them. Siva is away when Raji's father dies and Raghu takes care of the orphaned Raji, who is waiting for Siva to come back for her. Meanwhile, Siva hears people gossiping about Raghu and Raji and believes they are having an affair. When Raghu confronts him, he agrees to marry Raji if Raghu agrees to go away. Raghu agrees. How they reconcile forms the rest of the story.

Cast 

Sivaji Ganesan as Raghu
Muthuraman as Siva
Gopalakrishnan as Peter
Raghavan as Natarajan
Mali as Shankar
Senthamarai as a rowdy
K. R. Vijaya as Raji
Geetanjali as Sheela

Production 
After the success of Vennira Aadai (1965), Sridhar decided to make a film titled Nenjirukkum Varai revolving around the theme of war between India and Pakistan with Sivaji Ganesan portraying an army colonel; however Sridhar decided to drop this film after reading an article about Lal Bahadur Shastri and Ayub Khan signing the Tashkent Declaration. Sridhar then developed a story from the Bengali play Shudha, retaining the title Nenjirukkum Varai. He did not, however, adapt the play verbatim, but took only the basic premise and created an otherwise original story. Ganesan and Muthuraman, who were part of the dropped film, were retained for the new film. Sridhar and Gopu discussed the whole script during their car trip to Bangalore.

The song "Nenjirukkum Engalukku" was shot at Beach Road, Madras. The last scene of the song was shot at the fountain near the Mahatma Gandhi statue in the beach. None of the cast members applied make-up for their roles. Cinematography was handled by Balakrishnan who earlier worked as assistant cinematographer for Gemini Studios, and editing by N. M. Shankar. Unlike Sridhar's earlier films such as Kadhalikka Neramillai (1964) and Vennira Aadai, Nenjirukkum Varai was shot in black-and-white to emphasise the central theme of poverty.

Soundtrack 
Music was composed by M. S. Viswanathan. The song "Poo Mudippal" is set in Simhendramadhyamam raga. "Muthukkalo Kangal" is set in Madhyamavati and Kanada ragas.

Release and reception 
Nenjirukkum Varai was released on 2 March 1967, and distributed by Chitralaya themselves. Kalki said only half the film was excellent, and it was worth watching for Ganesan's performance. According to Sridhar, the film did not do well at box-office as audience could not digest Ganesan's character dying onscreen.

References

Bibliography

External links 
 

1960s Tamil-language films
1967 films
Films about poverty in India
Films directed by C. V. Sridhar
Films scored by M. S. Viswanathan
Films with screenplays by C. V. Sridhar
Indian black-and-white films